The following is a list of ecoregions in Ukraine, according to the Worldwide Fund for Nature (WWF):

Terrestrial

Temperate broadleaf and mixed forests
 Central European mixed forests (Austria, Belarus, Czech Republic, Germany, Lithuania, Moldova, Poland, Romania, Russia, Ukraine)
 Crimean Submediterranean forest complex (Russia, Ukraine)
 East European forest steppe (Bulgaria, Moldova, Romania, Russia, Ukraine)
 Pannonian mixed forests (Austria, Czech Republic, Romania, Russia, Serbia, Slovakia, Slovenia, Ukraine)

Temperate coniferous forests
 Carpathian montane conifer forests (Ukraine)

Temperate grasslands, savannas and shrublands
 Pontic steppe (Moldova, Romania, Russia, Ukraine)

Ukraine

ecoregions